Luca or LUCA may refer to:

People 
 Luca (masculine given name), including a list of people with the given name
 Luca (feminine given name), including a list of people with the given name
 Luca (surname), including a list of people with the surname

Arts and entertainment
 Luca (Final Fantasy character), character from Final Fantasy IV
 Luca (Final Fantasy setting), setting of the video games Final Fantasy X and Final Fantasy X-2
 Luca (Yu-Gi-Oh! 5D's), a fictional character from the Yu-Gi-Oh! 5D's anime series
 Luca Family Singers, an American singing group
 Luca (2019 film), an Indian Malayalam-language drama film
 Luca (2021 film), a Disney/Pixar animated film
 A song by Brand New from the album The Devil and God Are Raging Inside Me
 Luca, a young scrub jay from Angry Birds Stella and the animated movie
 Luca Bertaccini, a character in the video game Valorant

Biology
 Luca (genus), a genus of moths in the family Notodontidae
 Last universal common ancestor, the most recent organism from which all organisms on Earth descend

Other uses
 Informal slang for one thousand Chilean peso note
 London Universities and Colleges Athletics, the representative body for university athletics in London

See also 
 Dean & DeLuca, a chain of upscale grocery stores
 "Luca$", an episode of The Simpsons
 de Luca, a surname
 Luqa, a town in Malta
 Lucas (disambiguation)
 Lucca (disambiguation)
 Lucia (disambiguation)
 Luka (disambiguation)
 San Luca (disambiguation)